Dunehampton is the name of a village that was proposed in 2003 to be incorporated along  of Atlantic Ocean beach between Village of Southampton and the hamlet of Wainscott in the Town of Southampton, in Suffolk County, on the South Shore of Long Island, in New York, United States. The attempts to incorporate were unsuccessful.

Overview 
The proposal met stiff resistance from the nearby communities of Water Mill, Bridgehampton, and Sagaponack because they feared the village would impose strict parking rules on the beaches cutting them off from the ocean.

One of the most prominent residents along the narrow strip is Humvee tycoon Ira Rennert.

The petition to form the village was filed with the Southampton Town Supervisor Patrick A. Heaney on July 3, 2003. Residents of Sagaponack filed incorporation papers with the clerk on October 2, 2003. The two villages overlapped on the eastern portion of Dunehampton. Healy ultimately ruled that Dunehampton's application was not valid because it lacked the necessary number of signatures. Sagaponack's incorporation moved forward.</ref> Subsequent court cases have upheld the decisions.

Geography 
The village would have included 200 houses, and would have taken in Julie and Channel Ponds at the western edge of Southampton Village and much of Sagg Pond to its eastern end at the border with the Town of East Hampton.

References

Southampton (town), New York
Villages in Suffolk County, New York
East Hampton (town), New York